The Botswana Chess Championship is organized by the , which was founded in 1982.

Sponsors
Botswana Chess Championship has been sponsored by IBM. Metropolitan Botswana is the longest official sponsor of the event. Its partnership with Botswana Chess Federation started in 2006 up to date.

Winners

{| class="sortable wikitable"
! Year !! Champion
|-
| 1978 || Alfred Eddie Basa
|-
| 1981 || Graham Blackburne
|-
| 1982 || Pete Hamely
|-
| 1986 || Gotile Madikwe
|-
| 1987 || Dabilani Buthali
|-
| 1988 || John Hutchison
|-
| 1989 || John Hutchison
|-
| 1990 || John Hutchison
|-
| 1991 || John Hutchison
|-
| 1992 || Gosekelwe Moseki
|- 
| 1993 || Nedjo Stevanovic
|- 
| 1994 || Nedjo Stevanovic
|- 
| 1995 || Nedjo Stevanovic
|- 
| 1996 || Ignatius Njobvu
|-
| 1997 || Nedjo Stevanovic
|- 
| 1998 || Ofentse Molale
|- 
| 1999 || Ofentse Molale
|-
| 2000 || Ignatius Njobvu
|-
| 2001 || John Hutchison
|-
| 2002 || Ofentse Molale
|-
| 2003 || Ignatius Njobvu
|-
| 2004 || Providence Oatlhotse
|-
| 2005 || Phemelo Khetho
|-
| 2006 || Phemelo Khetho
|-
| 2007 || Phemelo Khetho
|-
| 2008 || Providence Oatlhotse
|-
| 2009 || Providence Oatlhotse
|-
| 2010 || Barileng Gaealafshwe
|-
| 2011 || Abel Dzilani
|-
| 2012 || Providence Oatlhotse
|-
| 2013 || Ignatius Njobvu
|-
| 2014 || Phemelo Khetho
|-
| 2015 || Providence Oatlhotse
|-
| 2016 || Barileng Gaealafshwe
|-
| 2017 || Barileng Gaealafshwe
|-
| 2018 || Providence Oatlhotse
|-
| 2019 || Phemelo Khetho
|-
| 2020 || Thuso Mosutha
|}

References

Chess national championships
Chess in Botswana
Sports competitions in Botswana
1978 in chess
Recurring sporting events established in 1978
1978 establishments in Botswana